Raymond Wayne Davenport (December 16, 1906April 27, 2001) was an American football halfback in the National Football League (NFL) who played for the Green Bay Packers.  Davenport played collegiate ball for Hardin–Simmons University and played professionally in the NFL for one season, in 1931.

References

External links
 Wayne Davenoport statistics at The Football Database

1906 births
2001 deaths
American football halfbacks
Hardin–Simmons Cowboys football players
Green Bay Packers players
People from San Saba, Texas
Players of American football from Texas